David Chaloner (18 October 1944 – 10 May 2010) was an English poet associated with the British Poetry Revival, and a prominent British designer.

Life
Chaloner was born in Mottram St Andrew in Cheshire. He attended Broken Cross community school in Macclesfield, left at 15, and had a successful career as a designer beginning in 1960. He ran his own design business and later worked as retail design director with the Conran Group (1995–2004), becoming interior and retail design director of Conran and Partners (2004–2006). He ran the design firm Chaloner Huisman of Amsterdam with Jane Huisman. He was a British Council design ambassador and a judge for the British Design Week awards.   His early poetry appeared in anthologies and magazines including The English Intelligencer and the 1960s classic underground anthology Children of Albion, edited by Michael Horovitz. His later more ambitious work was  published by leading independent presses in England and America, including Andrew Crozier's Ferry Press and Rosmarie and Keith Waldrop's Burning Deck. A substantial selection was included in A Various Art (Carcanet, 1987) and more recently in Vanishing Points (Salt, 2004). He edited and published One, a magazine of new writing (1971–81). His Collected Poems was published in 2005 and there is a published interview with Andrew Duncan in Don't Start Me Talking. He was married to Mary in 1968 and their daughter is Lucy Chaloner.

Bibliography

dark pages / slow turns / brief salves, London: Ferry, 1969
Year of Meteors, Gillingham, UK: Arc, 1972
Chocolate Sauce, London: Ferry, 1973
Projections, Providence, RI: Burning Deck, 1977
Today Backwards, London: Many, 1977
Fading into Brilliance, London: Oasis, 1978
Hotel Zingo, Wirksworth, UK: Grosseteste, 1981
Trans, Newcastle upon Tyne, UK: Galloping Dog, 1989
The Edge, Cambridge, UK: Equipage, 1993
Art for Others, Cambridge: Equipage, 1998
Delight's Wreckage, Kentisbeare, UK: Shearsman and London: Oasis, 2001
Collected Poems, Cambridge: Salt, 2005

References

2010 deaths
1944 births
English male poets
20th-century English poets
20th-century English male writers